Oppiidae is a family of mites belonging to the order Sarcoptiformes.

Genera
Genera:

References

Acari